Fritz Schider or Schieder (13 February 1846, Salzburg - 15 March 1907, Basel) was an Austrian painter, engraver and art teacher.

Biography 
He was born to a middle-class family of manufacturers. By 1865, he had decided to pursue a career as an artist and enrolled at the Academy of Fine Arts Vienna. There, he studied with Alexander von Wagner, Arthur von Ramberg and Wilhelm von Lindenschmit.

A year later, he accompanied his friend Hans Makart to Munich and entered Academy of Fine Arts there. He was also an admirer of Theodor Alt and the early works of Albert von Keller. In 1877, he married Lina Kirchdorffer (1854–1927), one of Leibl's nieces.

In 1876, he accepted an offer from the "Gesellschaft für das Gute und Gemeinnützige" in Basel and became a teacher at the company's drawing and modeling school. He was also employed by Julius Kollmann to help him with his Plastische Anatomie des menschlichen Körpers. Ein Handbuch für Künstler und Kunstfreunde (Anatomy for Artists). He later created his own large anatomy atlas, Plastisch-anatomische Studien für Akademien, Kunstgewerbeschulen und zum Selbstunterricht, which was published in installments from 1891 to 1894.

In 1885, he became a citizen of Basel. For his anatomical work with Kollmann, and independently, he was named an Honorary Doctor in the medical faculty at the University of Basel in 1896.

References

Further reading 
 Adolf Vögtlin: Fritz Schnider In: Die Schweiz, Vol. 8, 1904, pgs. 441–447.
 Michael Petzet: Wilhelm Leibl und sein Kreis. Prestel, Stuttgart 1974. 
 Hermann Uhde-Bernays: Münchener Landschafter im 19. Jahrhundert. Delphin-Verlag, Munich 1921.

External links 

 
 
 
 More works by Schider @ ArtNet

1846 births
1907 deaths
Austrian painters
Academy of Fine Arts Vienna alumni
Artists from Salzburg
Austrian emigrants to Switzerland